Harold Charles Wingham (25 June 1895 – 1969) was an English footballer who played in the Football League for Bournemouth & Boscombe Athletic, Clapton Orient and Norwich City.

References

1895 births
1969 deaths
English footballers
Association football defenders
English Football League players
Thornycroft Athletic F.C. players
AFC Bournemouth players
Leyton Orient F.C. players
Norwich City F.C. players
Salisbury City F.C. (1905) players